Epipristis oxyodonta is a moth of the family Geometridae first described by Louis Beethoven Prout in 1934. It is found in Western Australia, the Northern Territory and Queensland in Australia.

Adults are pale grey with a scalloped dark submarginal line on each wing. The underside of the wings is pale grey with a broad dark band along the margin, and a central dark spot.

References

Pseudoterpnini
Moths described in 1934
Taxa named by Louis Beethoven Prout